Pebbles is a brand of breakfast cereal introduced in the United States by Post Consumer Brands on October 20, 1971 featuring characters from the animated series The Flintstones as spokestoons. The product line includes Cocoa Pebbles and Fruity Pebbles.

Cocoa Pebbles contains chocolate-flavored crisp rice cereal bits, while Fruity Pebbles contains crisp rice cereal bits that come in a variety of fruit flavors with a sugar content of 9 grams per serving for Fruity Pebbles and 10 grams per serving for Cocoa Pebbles. It is the oldest cereal brand based on characters from a TV series or movie that is still sold.

Product history
Fruity Pebbles and Cocoa Pebbles Cereal were reintroductions of a low market-share Post children's cereal brand called Sugar Rice Krinkles. The Product Group Manager at the time, Larry Weiss, licensed use of The Flintstones for cereal from Hanna-Barbera (now part of Warner Bros. Animation) in an attempt to reinvigorate the children's cereal business for Post Cereals. Prior to that time, character licensing had been used for promotion, but there had never been a brand created around a media character. The brand was marketed despite internal concern it would be a fad and not last more than a year. Fruity Pebbles was introduced on the West Coast in 1969 first under simply the name “Pebbles” and strong consumer demand led to national distribution under the cereal re-name of “Fruity Pebbles”. In 1970 Cocoa Pebbles was introduced as a second flavor. The brand has been one of the most consistent best sellers ever since.

The original working names for the companion cereals were Flint Chips and Rubble Stones, consistent with the appearance of the cereal and The Flintstones' Stone Age imagery. Frank Corey, Benton & Bowles' creative head for the Post Cereal business suggested the alternative names Cocoa Pebbles and Fruity Pebbles, which were adopted.

The basic product retained the Sugar Rice Krinkles form, using the existing expander process and Battle Creek production facilities. After many iterations, the Cocoa Pebbles formula was set and has remained largely unchanged over the years. Fruity Pebbles also remained essentially unchanged for decades. In recent years some additions and variations have been made to the Fruity Pebbles product formulation. The Canadian version, no longer available, came in the form of pebble-shaped puffs composed of whole wheat, cornflour, and oat flour. Both Fruity Pebbles and Cocoa Pebbles were reformulated in the early-2010s industry-led sugar reduction effort: the original formulation contained 12 grams per 3/4 cup serving, while the 2011 reformulation (still current as of 2021) contains 9 grams sugar per 3/4 cup serving.

Product evolution

Unlike its sister cereal Cocoa Pebbles, Fruity Pebbles has undergone many formula changes, additions and variants. The cereal started out with three colors—orange, red, and yellow—and natural orange, lemon and tangerine flavors, but were later flavored in natural orange and artificial lemon and cherry. New colors were added over time: purple in 1985, green in 1987, "Berry Blue" in 1994, "Incrediberry Purple" in 1995 and "Bedrock Berry Pink" in 2005.

Upon Post's acquisition of MOM Brands in 2015 (the former Malt O Meal), both the Cocoa and Fruity versions of Pebbles, along with other Post brands, began to be offered in packaging similar to that of Malt O Meal's discounted generic line of bagged cereals alongside the traditional box sizes.

Pebbles has since expanded beyond only producing cereal. To celebrate the products' 50th birthday in 2021, Post partnered with the Love Your Melon hat company to produce winter hats and shirts. Post has also Licensed other food companies to put out other food products that bear both the Fruity and Cocoa Pebbles flavors including protein powder, white chocolate bars (with the actual cereal mixed in), ice cream (with or without the actual cereal in it), crisps, and Fruity and Cocoa Pebbles Marshmallow Treats (like those made with Rice Krispies), among others.

Television commercials
The earliest commercials produced by Post's ad agency D'Arcy Masius Benton & Bowles with cooperation from Hanna-Barbera featured the animated Fred Flintstone and Barney Rubble (as voiced by Alan Reed and Mel Blanc, respectively) interacting cheerfully with live-action children, eating the cereal around a typical household breakfast table; others showed Fred and Barney enjoying the cereal with their wives around their Bedrock breakfast table or in other locales and situations in Bedrock. 

Commercials after about 1978 were entirely animated and would have a typical plot repeated with various differences. Fred eats cereal while Barney would want some as well; to that end, Barney would either disguise himself or distract Fred from his bowl of cereal using various creative and increasingly outrageous means. While Fred was distracted, Barney would eat some Pebbles, but Fred would quickly discover Barney's deception, usually due to Barney's excitement at eating the cereal that would cause his trick to be discovered and/or his disguise falling apart. Mad about having his breakfast stolen, he would normally exclaim, "Barney! My Pebbles!" Barney would then chuckle and deliver a comedic line (Such as, "Hate to eat and run".) while running away from the angry Fred, and Fred would give chase. A frequently used tagline for these particular commercials was "They're Yabba-Dabba-Delicious!". Commercials for the cereal aired around the Christmas season feature Barney trying to steal the cereal, however, in the spirit of the holidays, Fred lets Barney have the cereal with him.

In 2009, Pebbles and Bamm-Bamm became more prominent in the commercials, which were produced by legendary animator Rick Reinert. 

From 2010 to 2012, the commercials for Pebbles cereal were produced by the ad agency Burns Group using stop motion animation with the tagline that the cereal "rocks your whole mouth". The former motif of Barney's cereal theft was removed to focus on the enjoyment of the cereal.

WWE professional wrestler John Cena is an official endorser of Fruity Pebbles as the result of references to the cereal made by Dwayne 'The Rock' Johnson over the course of 2011, where Rock nicknamed Cena (a bowl of) Fruity Pebbles based on his bright shirts.

From 2012 to 2014, Pebbles commercials changed to a scene where Bamm-Bamm destroys the 
Pebbles perform kung fu and other martial arts.

Since 2014, Pebbles commercials prompt viewers to take a side with either Team Cocoa or Team Fruity, and each individual advertisement includes a different child exemplifying their devoutness to one of the teams. Various celebrities, such as actress Bella Thorne, retired professional basketball player Shaquille O'Neal, and professional soccer player Alex Morgan have been chosen as mascots for either group, as well.

Box cover illustrations
The box covers for the various Pebbles boxes have been illustrated by commercial artist Seymour Schachter [Seymour Schachter Illustration] since 2004.

Lawsuit
In May 2010, a controversial commercial of Cocoa Pebbles led to a lawsuit by WWE wrestler Hulk Hogan. In the spring of 2010, a commercial where Barney and Fred face off against a wrestler named Hulk Boulder aired on TV. The commercial ended with Hulk Boulder getting smashed to pieces by Bamm-Bamm after losing the wrestling match.  Hulk Hogan sued Post, saying they stole his image to promote Pebbles and that his image had been damaged by the commercials. He used the name Hulk Boulder early in his career until his name was changed to sound more Irish. The suit was settled in September 2010 with a condition of banning the commercial from repeats.

Varieties

References

External links

 
 Nutrition Facts for Fruity Pebbles Cereal

Post cereals
Products introduced in 1971
The Flintstones